National Trails are long distance footpaths and bridleways in England and Wales. They are administered by Natural England, a statutory agency of the UK government, and Natural Resources Wales (successor body to the Countryside Council for Wales), a Welsh Government-sponsored body.

National Trails are marked with an acorn symbol along the route.

In Scotland, the equivalent trails are called Scotland's Great Trails and are administered by NatureScot.

List of National Trails

 Cleveland Way in England
 Coast to Coast in England (announced in 2020)
 Cotswold Way in England
 England Coast Path around England (planned to be completed by 2020)
 Glyndŵr's Way in Wales
 Hadrian's Wall Path in England
 North Downs Way in England
 Offa's Dyke Path in Wales and England
 Peddar's Way and Norfolk Coast Path in England (treated as a single National Trail)
 Pembrokeshire Coast Path in Wales
 Pennine Bridleway in England (bridleway)
 Pennine Way mainly in England with a short distance in Scotland
 The Ridgeway in England (mostly bridleway/restricted byway/byway)
 South Downs Way in England (bridleway)
 South West Coast Path (South West Way) in England—the UK's longest
 Thames Path in England
 Yorkshire Wolds Way in England

See also
Long-distance footpaths in the United Kingdom

References

External links
 National Trails

 National Trails

de:Fernwanderweg (Vereinigtes Königreich)#Die National Trails Englands und Wales’